Zhangguizhuang is a subdistrict and the district seat of Dongli District, Tianjin, China. It shares border with Xinli Subdistrict in the north and south, Fengniancun Subdistrict in the east, as well as Erhaoqiao and Wanxin Subdistricts in the west. As of 2010, the subdistirct had a census population of 45,391.

Its name Zhangguizhuang refers to the village that used to exist in the area.

History

Administrative divisions 
By the end of 2022, Zhangguizhuang Subdistrict consisted of 5 residential communities. They are, by the order of their Administrative Division Codes:

See also 

 List of township-level divisions of Tianjin

Information of Zhangguizhuang, Official website of Dongli District Government

References 
Township-level divisions of Tianjin
Dongli District